Sanwer Assembly constituency is one of the 230 Vidhan Sabha (Legislative Assembly) constituencies of Madhya Pradesh state in central India. It is reserved for the candidates belonging to the Scheduled caste from its inception.

Overview 
Sanwer Assembly constituency is one of the eight Vidhan Sabha constituencies located in Indore district which comes under Indore (Lok Sabha constituency). Constituency includes Sanwer, Kanadia, Khudail, Khajrana, Lasudia Mori, Talawali Chanda Patwar of Indore city.

Members of Legislative Assembly

See also

 Indore
 Indore (Lok Sabha constituency)

References

Politics of Indore
Assembly constituencies of Madhya Pradesh